is a Japanese footballer currently playing as a midfielder for FC Imabari.

Career statistics

Club
.

Notes

References

External links

1992 births
Living people
Sportspeople from Ehime Prefecture
Association football people from Ehime Prefecture
Japanese footballers
Association football midfielders
Osaka University of Health and Sport Sciences alumni
Japan Football League players
J3 League players
Honda Lock SC players
FC Imabari players